Nasse is a surname. Notable people with the surname include:

Albert Nasse (1878–1910), American rower 
Christian Friedrich Nasse (1778–1851), German physician and psychiatrist
Saul Nassé (born 1965), English television producer

See also
Nasse-setä (Finnish for "Uncle Nasse"), Finnish sketch comedy character
Nasse Strahlegg, is a peak of the Bernese Alps
Ward-Nasse Gallery, art gallery for visual, spoken and performing artists in New York City

References